Lily Jacoba van den Broecke  (born 8 January 1992) is a British rower who competed at the 2012 Summer Paralympics as the coxswain in the mixed coxed four for Great Britain, and won the gold medal.

Personal life
Lily van den Broecke was born on 8 January 1992 in Lambeth, England.
She went to primary school at St Thomas' CE in Winchelsea East Sussex and moved to Oxford for secondary school. 
She was a student at Durham University, belonging to University College, Durham more commonly known as Castle. Lily studied for a Bachelor of Arts degree in Politics, Philosophy and Economics. She now works at the British Film Institute in London and has a keen interest in film, art, and aesthetics. Lily maintains a fondness for classical music and spends much, if not most, of her spare time composing hymns for the recorder.

Rowing
She began rowing when she attended Headington School, Oxford. After competing in sculling for four years she tried out as a cox. In 2009, she coxed the junior women's eight crew to fourth place at the Australian Youth Olympic Festival and a gold medal at the Coupe de la Jeunesse in Vichy, France. In 2010, she won a gold medal coxing the junior women's eight at the World Rowing Junior Championships in Račice, Czech Republic. This was the first ever junior women's gold medal for the Great Britain Rowing Team.

In 2011, she competed at the World Rowing Championships held at Lake Bled, Bled, Slovenia. She won a gold medal in the LTAMix4+ event coxing a crew of Pam Relph, Naomi Riches, James Roe and David Smith. They completed the one kilometre course in a time of three minutes, 27.10 seconds, finishing nearly five seconds ahead of runners-up Canada. The result qualified a boat for Great Britain into the 2012 Summer Paralympics in London. The crew repeated their gold medal result at the Munich World Cup event in 2012.

She was selected to cox the crew of Pam Relph, Naomi Riches, James Roe and David Smith in the mixed coxed four event for Great Britain at the 2012 Summer Paralympics. The event took place between 31 August and 2 September at Eton Dorney in Buckinghamshire, and the GB crew won the gold medal.

She was appointed Member of the Order of the British Empire (MBE) in the 2013 New Year Honours for services to rowing and Paralympic sport.

See also
 2012 Summer Olympics and Paralympics gold post boxes

References

1992 births
Living people
People from Lambeth
English female rowers
Rowers at the 2012 Summer Paralympics
Paralympic rowers of Great Britain
Rowers from Greater London
Alumni of University College, Durham
Paralympic gold medalists for Great Britain
Members of the Order of the British Empire
Coxswains (rowing)
Medalists at the 2012 Summer Paralympics
World Rowing Championships medalists for Great Britain
Durham University Boat Club rowers
Paralympic medalists in rowing